Downary-Plac  is a village in the administrative district of Gmina Goniądz, within Mońki County, Podlaskie Voivodeship, in north-eastern Poland.

Downary-Plac are located on the edge of the Biebrza Valley and coatings for the Biebrza National Park. By the village runs a country road  and county road connecting the Trzcianne Goniądz.  It was formed in rural areas  Downary in the 19th century as a settlement - the tsarist army barracks located near the Osowiec Fortress.

References

Downary-Plac